Heinrich Bichler (also Hans Bichler, Heinrich Büchler or Hans Büchler; 1466–1497) was a Swiss painter.

Bichler was born in Bern, and later went on to be the instructor for the painter Hans Fries. In 1472 Bichler painted a portrait of Sulpitius the Pious for the Schloss Thorberg. He also completed a coat of arms for two gates leading to the city of Fribourg in 1478, and a scene portraying the Battle of Morat in 1480.

References
This article was initially translated from the German Wikipedia.
 
 

15th-century Swiss painters
1466 births
1497 deaths
Artists from Bern